Féile is an Irish word meaning festival (see also :Category:Festivals in Ireland). This may refer to:

 Féile an Phobail, August arts festival in West Belfast
 Féile FM, radio station during the festival
 Féile (music festival), a music event held annually 1990–97, and again in 2018, usually in Thurles, County Tipperary
 Féile na nGael, GAA youth jamboree and tournaments
 River Feale in west Munster
 Soma Festival in Castlewellan, County Down